Dolores Ashcroft-Nowicki (born 11 June 1929) is a British occult author, third generation psychic, and esoteric practitioner. As an associate of Walter Ernest Butler, she succeeded him as Director of Studies of the Servants of the Light.

Early life
Dolores Ashcroft-Nowicki was born and raised in Jersey Island. Ashcroft-Nowicki's grandmother was a full-blooded Romani and her parents were both third-degree initiates. She grew up in a family tradition dedicated to the occult sciences. During World War II she left with her family to live on the Wirral Peninsula in the northwest of England. She spent her spare time visiting the Roma who used to camp there. There, she learned  about the natural world, tarot cards and fortune telling. After the war, the family returned to Jersey and her parents formed a clandestine occult discussion group due to restrictions imposed by Jersey's law.

Occult career
During the 1960s, Ashcroft-Nowicki entered the Fraternity of the Inner Light, an esoteric order founded by occultist Dion Fortune. There it was where she became associated with Walter Ernest Butler, and with Gareth Knight and the Helios Course in Practical Qabalah which, in 1971, became the foundation of Servants of the Light. In 1976, when Butler retired, Ashcroft-Nowicki became the Director of Studies of the SOL, a position she handed on in June 2018 to Steven Critchley.

Personal life
Ashcroft-Nowicki went to London to study Royal Academy of Dramatic Art later on she studied Opera at Trinity College of Music in Cambridge. She briefly interrupted her studies to get married, but got divorced three years later. She would then return to her studies, and complete them. 
Ashcroft-Nowicki was also very interested in Fencing and even represented the Islands against France and England in competition. She won several cups and trophies and even met her future husband Michael Nowicki at a fencing club. They married in 1957 and have two children, Tamara and Carl. The family moved back to the Channel Island of Jersey, off the coast of France.

Published works

To date, Ashcroft-Nowicki has written several books and designed two tarot decks, the SOL Tarot Deck with Jo Gill and Anthony Clark, and the Shakespearean Tarot with Paul Hardy.

 An Anthology of Occult Wisdom
 Daughters of Eve: The Magical Mysteries of Womanhood
 First Steps in Ritual
 Highways of the Mind: The Art and History of Pathworking
 Illuminations: The Healing of the Soul
 Inner Landscapes: A Journey into Awareness by Pathworking
 Magical Use of Thought Forms
 Shadows and Light
 The Door Unlocked
 The Initiate's Book of Pathworking
 The Sacred Cord Meditations
 The Servants of the Light Tarot
 The Shining Paths
 The Singing Stones
 The New Book of the Dead 
 The Ritual Magic Workbook
 The Tree of Ecstasy
 Your Unseen Power: Real Training in Western Magic

References

Citations

Works cited

Further reading

External links

Dolores Ashcroft-Nowicki at the Servants of the Light website (archived)

An interview with Dolores Ashcroft-Nowicki in ConnectionsJournal (1995)

1929 births
Living people
British occult writers
Hermetic Qabalists
Society of the Inner Light